Rajarishi is a title in Hinduism and Hindu mythology, referring to a sage who hails from a royal background.

Description
A rajarishi may be described to be a king (raja) who adopted a path of devotion, thereby becoming a royal sage (rishi). A rajarishi does not have to leave the kingship to become rishi, as in the example of Vishvamitra (who later becomes a Brahmarishi), but could attain the status of a sage through self-realisation during his reign. A rajarishi still performs the duties of their kshatriya class, and remain similar to most rishis, maharishis, and brahmarishis descendants in their level of spiritual knowledge. Another example of Rajarshi is King Janaka, who is said to have attained self-Knowledge from the ascetic sage Astavakra. 

They belong to the four types of rishis mentioned in Hinduism and Vedas.
 Rajarshi
 Maharishi
 Brahmarshi
 Devarishi

Literature 
In Vedas and Holy scriptures of Hindusim, the name and Rajarshi has its own meaning and it's widely being applied for few ancient historical Hindu Legends who always and still now stood as examples of sacrifices for achieving a greater cause for the humanity and the prevalent societies. 
There are the mention of namely two Rajarshi in Vedic History.
 Rajarshi Mudgal
 Rajarshi Vishwamitra
Rajarshi Mudgal wrote 1 Upnishad out of 108 Upnishads named Mudgalupnishad. Mudgalupnishad is unique amongst upanishads, as it mainly contains information and praise concerning Lord Ganesha, and how to pray and perform Yajna and Puja of Lord Ganpati.

The great sage strongly believed in simple living high thinking and had a high level patience amongst other Rishis. That's why still today the persons belonged to Mudgal Gotra are considered highly ethical and had infinite patience in compare to average.

Rajarshi Mudgal has also been cited for declaring to his wife that in her next birth she would have Five Husbands. And due to his words, his wife was born as Draupadi, the daughter of King Drupada in her next birth.

The great sage Vishvamitra was also called Rajarshi who later went on to become Brahmarshi.

Another famous figure named Rajarshi in somehow present era was Purusottam Das Tandon. He was the one who is regarded as the person to make Hindi the Official Language of Independent India. He was awarded Bharat Ratna (India's Highest Civilian Award) in year 1961.

Also Chhatrapati Shahu Maharaj of Kolhapur(26 June 1874 – 6 May 1922) is known as  Rajarshi Shahu. During his rule in Kolhapur State from 1894 till death in 1922, he worked for lower caste, education to all, social reforms, reservation, agriculture reforms & much more.

References

See also
Hindu mythology
Hinduism
Rajarshi Janaka
Ramayana

Rishis
Titles and occupations in Hinduism